This is a list of Liberty Flames football players in the NFL Draft.

Key

Selections

References

Liberty

Liberty Flames NFL Draft